Xanthocrambus lucellus is a species of moth in the family Crambidae. It is found in France, Germany, Switzerland, Austria, Italy, Slovakia, Hungary, Romania, Croatia, Bosnia and Herzegovina, Russia, Korea, China and Japan.

The wingspan is about 25–27 mm.

References

Moths described in 1848
Crambinae
Moths of Japan
Moths of Europe